André Labatut (18 July 1891 – 30 September 1977) was a French fencer. He won medals in the foil and épée competitions at three Olympic Games.

References

External links
 

1891 births
1978 deaths
French male épée fencers
Olympic fencers of France
Fencers at the 1920 Summer Olympics
Fencers at the 1924 Summer Olympics
Fencers at the 1928 Summer Olympics
Olympic gold medalists for France
Olympic silver medalists for France
Olympic medalists in fencing
Medalists at the 1920 Summer Olympics
Medalists at the 1924 Summer Olympics
Medalists at the 1928 Summer Olympics
Sportspeople from Bordeaux
French male foil fencers
20th-century French people